Lioglyphostoma jousseaumei is a species of sea snail, a marine gastropod mollusk in the family Pseudomelatomidae, the turrids.

Description
The length of the shell attains 13 mm.

Distribution
This marine species occurs off New Caledonia and off the Andaman Islands; in the Caribbean Sea off Guadeloupe

References

 Melvill, J. C. (1895). Descriptions of new species of Pleurotoma, Mitra, and Latirus. Proceedings of the Malacological Society of London. 1(221): 14
 Dautzenberg, Ph. "Croizière du yacht Chazalie dans l’Atlantique. Mollusques." Mémoires de la Société zoologique de France 13 (1900): 1-50.

External links
 
 Gastropods.com: Lioglyphostoma jousseaumei

jousseaumei
Gastropods described in 1900